BC Gostivar is a basketball club based in Gostivar, North Macedonia. In the past it was known as Nikol Fert for sponsorship reasons.

History

The team was established in 1954 under name KK Mavrovo. It changed its name numerous times over the year. KK Goteks, KK Vardar-Komerc, KK Gostivar and KK Nikol-Fert Gostivar. KK Gostivar  is three times republic league champion of Macedonia. In the golden age of its existence it won three title in: 1965, 1967 and 1968. They waited for a long time for their fourth title but after 32 years they won their 4th title in 2000. Next year in the season 2000-01 they won their first Macedonian Basketball Cup by beating KK Rabotnički in the final 72–65. Next season they once again defeated Rabotnički 88–82 to claim back to back Cup titles.

Honours
Macedonian First League
 Winner (4): 1964–65, 1966–67, 1967–68, 1999–2000

Macedonian Cup
 Winner(2): 2001, 2002Macedonian Super Cup Winner (2): 2000, 2002

Players

Current roster

Depth chart

Former players

 Radislav Jovanoski
 Milan Sotirovski
 Todor Gečevski
 Jordančo Davitkov
 Dejan Dimov
 Marjan Janevski
 Slobodan Petrovski
 Vlatko Vladičevski
 Vojislav Zivčević
 Pero Blazevski
 Gjorgji Knjazev
 Budimir Jolović
 Bojan Trajkovski
 Josip Sičić
 Dušan Sučević
 Dejan Jeftić
  Michail Misunov
  Artan Kuqo

European competitions
They played 4 times in European competition. In the season 1996/97, 1999/00 and 2000/01 they played in FKC/FIBA Korac Cup. In the 2002/03 season they played in FRC/FIBA-Europe Regional Challenge.

Scores of KK Nikolfert Gostivar in Europe:

1996 Radivoj Korać Cup

1999 Radivoj Korać Cup

1999 Radivoj Korać Cup

2002 Europe Champions Cup

References

External links
 Eurobasket.com KK Gostivar Page
 

Basketball teams in North Macedonia
Basketball teams in Yugoslavia
Gostivar